Russia has competed at the European Games since the inaugural 2015 Games.

Medal tables

Medals by Games

Medals by sport

See also
 Russia at the Olympics
 Russia at the Youth Olympics

References